Adolf Karl Friedrich Nickol, originally Nickel (10 March 1824, Schöppenstedt - 21 May 1905, Braunschweig) was a German landscape and animal painter.

Life and work 

He was born to Heinrich Anton Karl Julius Nickel (1778–1854), a dye master, and his wife, Johanna Magdalena Luise née Niemeier (1781–1848). They recognized his artistic talents, and arranged for him to take painting lessons.

In 1846, due to his above average work, he was able to attend classes at the Academy of Fine Arts, Munich, without actually being enrolled there. He also took an extended study trip through the Netherlands, Belgium and France.

In 1851, he returned to Braunschweig and opened his own studio. Further travels followed, and he spent a year in Rome from 1853 to 1854. Two years later his former professor, Brandes, proposed that the Collegium appoint him as his assistant, and the proposal was accepted. After Brandes' death in 1868, upon a recommendation by the Rector, Julius Dedekind, he replaced Brandes as the school's primary drawing teacher. In 1870, he was appointed a professor.

He received several awards from Wilhelm, Duke of Braunschweig. In 1899, he was appointed a Privy Councillor. He was awarded the Commander's Cross in the Order of Henry the Lion in 1903.

References

Further reading 
 Emmanuel Bénézit, "Nickol, Adolf or Karl Friedrich Adolf", Benezit Dictionary of Artists, Vol.10,: Müller–Pinchetti, Gründ, 2006 
 "Nickol, Adolf". In: Hans Vollmer (Ed.): Allgemeines Lexikon der Bildenden Künstler von der Antike bis zur Gegenwart, Vol.25: Moehring–Olivié. E. A. Seemann, Leipzig 1931, pg.445
 Mechthild Wiswe: "Nickol [eigentlich Nickel], Karl Friedrich Adolf, Prof", In: Horst-Rüdiger Jarck, Dieter Lent et al. (Eds.): Braunschweigisches Biographisches Lexikon, Appelhans Verlag, Braunschweig 2006, pg.440

External links

1824 births
1905 deaths
German painters
German landscape painters
Animal painters
Academy of Fine Arts, Munich alumni
People from Wolfenbüttel (district)